Neurorehabilitation is a complex medical process which aims to aid recovery from a nervous system injury, and to minimize and/or compensate for any functional alterations resulting from it.

Features
In case of a serious disability, such as caused by a severe spinal injury or brain damage, the patient and their families' abilities, life style, and projects, are suddenly shattered. In order to cope with this situation, the person and their family must establish and negotiate a "new way of living", both with their changed body and as a changed individual within their wider community.

Thus, neurorehabilitation works with the skills and attitudes of the disabled person and their family and friends. It promotes their skills to work at the highest level of independence possible for them. It also encourages them to rebuild self-esteem and a positive mood. Thus, they can adapt to the new situation and become empowered for successful and committed community reintegration.
Neurorehabilitation should be:

 Holistic It should cater for the physical, cognitive, psychological, social and cultural dimensions of the personality, stage of progress and lifestyle of both the patient and their family.
 Patient-focused Customized health care strategies should be developed, focused on the patient (and family).
 Inclusive Care-plans should be designed and implemented by multidisciplinary teams made up of highly qualified and motivated practitioners experienced in multidisciplinary teamwork.
 Participatory The patient and their family's active cooperation is essential. The patient and family must be well-informed, and a trusting relationship with the multidisciplinary team must be built.
 Sparing Treatment must aim at empowering the patient to maximise independence, and to reduce physical impairment and reliance on mobility aids.
 Lifelong The patient's various needs throughout their life must be catered for, by ensuring continuity of care all the way through from injury onset to the highest possible level of recovery of function. This may include addressing medical complications of the injury or illness later in life.
 Resolving Treatment has to include adequate human and material resources for efficiently resolving each patient's problems as they arise.
 Community-focused. It is necessary to look for the solutions best adapted to the specific characteristics of the community and to further the creation of community resources favouring the best possible community reintegration of the disabled person.

Commonly treated conditions 

 Stroke
 Spinal Cord Injury
 Cerebral palsy
 Parkinson's disease
 Brain injury
 Anoxic brain injury
 Traumatic brain injury
 Multiple sclerosis
 Post-polio syndrome
 Guillain–Barré syndrome

How it works

By focusing on all aspects of a person's functional independence and well-being, neurorehabilitation offers a series of therapies from the Medications, Physiotherapy, speech and swallow therapy, psychological therapies, occupational therapies, teaching or re-training patients on mobility skills, communication processes, and other aspects of that person's daily routine. Neurorehabilitation also provides focuses on nutrition, psychological, and creative parts of a person's recovery.

Many neurorehabilitation programs, whether offered by hospitals or at private, specialized clinics, have a wide variety of specialists in many different fields to provide the most well rounded treatment of patients. These treatments, over a period of time, and often over the lifetime of a person, allow that individual and that person's family to live the most normal, independent life possible.

While the field of neurorehabilitation is relatively new, many therapies are controversial, and while some are considered cutting-edge technology, there may be little research to support whether or not helpful progress is the result. Neurorehabilitation is the culmination of many different fields to provide the best care and education for patients with injuries or diseases affecting their nervous system.

Types

The most important therapies are those that help people live their everyday lives. These include physiotherapy, occupational therapy, rehabilitation psychology, speech and swallow therapy, vision therapy, and language therapy, and therapies focused on daily function and community re-integration. A particular focus is given to improving mobility and strength, as this is key to a person's independence.

Neurorehabilitation is a team work. The specialists who participate are with specific skill sets, includes Physiatrist or Rehabilitation medicine specialist, Neurologist, Neurosurgeon, other medical specialists, Physiotherapists, Occupational therapists, Respiratory therapists, Prothetist and Orthotist, Rehabilitation nurse, Psychologists, Vocational counselor, and many more. Physiotherapy includes helping patients recover the ability of physical actions which includes: balance retraining, gait analysis and transfer training, neuromuscular retraining, orthotics consultations, and aqua therapy. Occupational therapy helps patients in activities of daily living. Some of these include: home modifications and safety training (Fall prevention strategies), cognitive rehabilitation - retraining for memory, attention, processing, and executive functions. It may also include neuro-muscular strengthening and training, and visual perceptual skill development. Rehabilitation psychologists and Speech-Language Pathologists and have begun to provide cognitive rehabilitation as well with goals that emphasize instruction in life-changes that facilitate increased independence. Speech and language therapy includes assisting patients with swallowing and communication issues.  Rehabilitation psychology includes helping patients deal with their changed, often dramatically so, circumstances especially coping to a changed identity of self as a result of adaptions and changes necessitated by brain injury.

Technological developments

Over the last decade with the aid of science and technology, we are more familiar with the human brain and its function than ever before. Development in neuroimaging techniques has greatly enhanced the scope and outcome of neurorehabilitation. Now, scientists are using technology with neurorehabilitation to provide cutting edge improvements to therapies for patients with nervous system issues. In particular, the use of robotics in neurorehabilitation is becoming more and more common.

Virtual reality simulations and video games provide patients with an interactive way to explore and re-learn different aspects of their lives and environments while being observed within the safety of their treating therapists and physicians. These devices and simulations, along with other robotic technology, offer patients who have just had strokes, other brain or spinal cord injuries the option of training and physical therapy much sooner than might otherwise be possible, thus shortening the recovery period.

See also
Rehabilitation psychology
Rehabilitation (neuropsychology)
Neurophysiotherapy
Neuroscience

Notes 
This article incorporates material from the Institut Guttmann, who consents publication licensed by the Free Documentation GNU/GFDL

References

External links 
 Institut Guttmann
 Instituto Caren de Neurorehabilitación
 Infography about Neurorehabilitation
 World Federation of Neurorehabilitation

Clinical neuroscience
Neurotrauma